David Michel Acosta Márquez (born 14 February 1988) is a Uruguayan footballer currently playing as a defensive midfielder for Atenas.

Career
Acosta started his professional career playing with his local city team Paysandú F.C. in 2005.

On 23 July 2013, he signed a contract with Cypriot side AEK Kouklia.

International career
Acosta played for the Uruguay U17 team at the 2005 South American Under-17 Football Championship held in Venezuela. Uruguay went on to qualify for the 2005 FIFA U-17 World Championship held in Peru and Acosta was selected for the squad to play in the tournament. Uruguay finished at the bottom of their group with 0 points.

References

External links
 

1988 births
Living people
Footballers from Paysandú
Association football midfielders
Uruguayan footballers
Uruguayan expatriate footballers
Uruguay youth international footballers
Uruguayan Primera División players
Uruguayan Segunda División players
Cypriot First Division players
Ascenso MX players
Venezuelan Primera División players
Bolivian Primera División players
Paysandú F.C. players
Liverpool F.C. (Montevideo) players
Atenas de San Carlos players
AEK Kouklia F.C. players
Atlético Venezuela C.F. players
Guabirá players
Expatriate footballers in Cyprus
Expatriate footballers in Mexico
Expatriate footballers in Venezuela
Expatriate footballers in Bolivia
Uruguayan expatriate sportspeople in Cyprus
Uruguayan expatriate sportspeople in Mexico
Uruguayan expatriate sportspeople in Venezuela
Uruguayan expatriate sportspeople in Bolivia